St Stephens is a Boys school in central Pathanapuram, Kerala, India and is managed by the Mount Tabor Dayara which is under the Malankara Orthodox Syrian Church. The school offers classes from the 5th std to 12th std, and offers academic streams such as Commerce, Science and Humanities. This is the only high school (Kerala Board). The school is near the Pathanapuram KSRTC bus stand and is just walkable distance from the Town centre.

This school is dedicated for boys and doesn't possess a pre-primary department. The girls' school (Mount Tabore Girls School) run by the same management functions from a nearby compound. The school is non-residential in nature despite having a hostel run by the priest monks of the Dayara. It has both  Malayalam and English-medium sections and the students can choose the medium of instruction.

References

High schools and secondary schools in Kerala
Schools in Kollam district